Swami Vivekanada Institute of Technology (SVIT) is an engineering college in the premises of Mahbub College High School grounds in Patny Centre, Secunderabad of Hyderabad District.

History

SVIT is located in the premises of Mahboob College, which has a historical significance. This institute was founded in 1862 by Somasundaram Mudaliar, as a first public school for primary education and witnessed turn of two centuries. In 1893, Swami Vivekananda addressed a large gathering on the site of the present-day school. Started as a primary school, Mahboob College now also offers graduate and post graduate education in professional streams. The engineering division of SVIT was established on 12 April 2004, which has later expanded to offer post graduate degree. The institution is named after Swami Vivekananda.

Academics
Swami Vivekananda Institute of Technology is affiliated to JNTU, Hyderabad, approved by the All India Council for Technical Education and recognized by Government of Telangana ( Erstwhile Andhra Pradesh). The engineering department offers graduation in five major branches
 Computer Science Engineering
 Electronics and Communications Engineering
 Information Technology
 Mechanical engineering Mechanical Engineering 
 
There is also a post graduation department in this institute under which offers 
 Masters in Business Administration

Admissions

Admission in to the course is offered students who have qualified EAMCET Examination and completed Intermediate(+2) or its equivalent. The candidates will be admitted by EAMCET Convener strictly in accordance with the rank secured at the Entrance Examination and keeping the rules applicable in view, regarding the reservation of seats of various categories of candidates.
To seek admission under CATEGORY – B, a student should either have obtained a rank or should have secured a minimum aggregate percentage of 50% in group subjects (Maths, Physics and Chemistry) in the Intermediate Examination of the Board of Intermediate Education, Government of Telangana ( Erstwhile Andhra Pradesh) or any other examination recognized by the Government of Telangana ( Erstwhile Andhra Pradesh ) OR as its equivalent.

All the candidates seeking admission into First year B.Tech under Category – B, are required to contact Admissions Officer, SVIT in person and obtain the application form and submit the same duly filled-in before the cut-off date as prescribed by the college. Candidates are shortlisted in accordance with rules laid down by Government of Telangana (Erstwhile Andhra Pradesh) and shortlisted candidates are called for admission as per the list.

Campus
The campus of the college has the qualities of a typical engineering college in Telangana (Erstwhile Andhra Pradesh). It shares space with Mahbub College High School. Due to sharing 3 institutions the space in this campus limited. The main problem in this institute is the non-availability of sports ground.

Library
 The library is located in the first floor of the main building. It has a collection of 20,000 volumes as of April 2012.
 The library is further augmented by over 120 national and international journals. Further the library subscribes to a sizable number of E-journals.

Faculty
There is a mix of senior professors and junior lecturers at the college. Nagababa ranked the faculty in the Electronics & Communication Engineering department as the best among all the faculty in the school.

Events 
 Annual fest 2014" SVIT-ELIXIR 2014"
 Celebrating Bathukamma " the flowers festival of Telangana"
Every year SVIT will organize these events.

References

Engineering colleges in Hyderabad, India
Educational institutions established in 2004
2004 establishments in Andhra Pradesh